In loop quantum gravity, an s-knot is an equivalence class of spin networks under diffeomorphisms. In this formalism, s-knots represent the quantum states of the gravitational field.

External links 
 Living Reviews in Relativity: Loop Quantum Gravity: Diffeomorphism invariance
 

Loop quantum gravity